Makaniyeh-ye Salahaviyeh (also Romanized as Makanīyeh-ye Salāḥāvīyeh) is a village in Darkhoveyn Rural District, in the Central District of Shadegan County, Khuzestan Province, Iran. At the 2006 census, its population was 769, in 100 families.

References 

Populated places in Shadegan County